Saint-Julien-Beychevelle is a commune on the left bank of the Garonne estuary in the Gironde department in Nouvelle-Aquitaine in southwestern France.

Population

Wine

The  of vineyards around the villages of St-Julien and Beychevelle produce wine of relative lightness and balance. Its strength stems from the quality of its soil – the characteristic layer of gravel forcing the roots of the vine to go to extra depth to reach its nutrients, as well as retaining additional heat to see it through the cooling winds from the Atlantic away to the west.

St-Julien contains no First Growths but it does have estates ranked as Second, Third and Fourth Growths in the Bordeaux Wine Official Classification of 1855.

See also
Bordeaux wine regions
Communes of the Gironde department

References

Communes of Gironde